The 2018–19 United Counties League season (known as the 2018–19 Future Lions United Counties League for sponsorship reasons) was the 112th in the history of the United Counties League, a football competition in England.

The provisional club allocations for steps 5 and 6 were announced by the FA on 25 May. The constitution is subject to ratification by the league at its AGM on 16 June.

Premier Division

The Premier Division featured 18 clubs which competed in the division last season, along with two new clubs:
Pinchbeck United, promoted from Division One
Rugby Town, transferred from the Midland League

League table

Division One

Division One featured 14 clubs which competed in the division last season, along with six new clubs.
Clubs relegated from the Premier Division:
Northampton Sileby Rangers
St Andrews
Clubs transferred from the East Midlands Counties League:
Anstey Nomads
Aylestone Park
Birstall United
Holwell Sports

League table

References

External links
United Counties League FA Full Time

9
United Counties League seasons